Manhunt may refer to:

Search processes 
 Manhunt (law enforcement), a search for a dangerous fugitive
 Manhunt (military), a search for a high-value target by special operations forces or intelligence agencies

Social organisations 
 Manhunt (social network), an online dating service for gay men
 Manhunt International, an international beauty pageant for men, begun 1993

Sport 
 Manhunt (urban game), the name of a number of variations on the game of tag

Titled works

Television

Series
 Manhunt (1959 TV series), a syndicated crime show, starring Victor Jory
 Manhunt (1969 TV series), a drama set in World War II
 Manhunt (2001 TV series), a reality TV on UPN
 Manhunt (2004 TV series), a model competition
 Manhunt (2017 TV series), an American anthology drama series
 Manhunt (2019 TV series), an ITV drama series about the investigations that caught Levi Bellfield and Delroy Grant
 Manhunt – Solving Britain's Crimes, on ITV starting 2006
 Lone Target, a reality TV, a.k.a. Manhunt, 2014

Episodes
 "Manhunt" (Captain Scarlet), 1967
 "Man Hunt" (Dad's Army), 1969
 "Manhunt" (Due South)
 "Manhunt" (Highlander)
 "Manhunt" (Prison Break)
 "Manhunt" (Star Trek: The Next Generation)
 "Manhunt" (Under the Dome)
 "Manhunt" (The Unit)

Film
 The Man Hunt, a 1918 American comedy drama film directed by Travers Vale
 Man Hunt (1933 film), a mystery film directed by Irving Cummings
 Man Hunt (1936 film), a comedy film directed by William Clemens
 Man Hunt (1941 film), directed by Fritz Lang
 Man Hunt (1985 film), a Western film directed by Fabrizio De Angelis
 Manhunt (1972 film), also known as The Italian Connection (La mala ordina), a crime film directed by Fernando di Leo
 Kimi yo Fundo no Kawa o Watare, a 1976 Japanese film also known as Manhunt
 Manhunt (2008 film), a 2008 Norwegian horror film
 Manhunt (2017 film), directed by John Woo, a remake of Kimi yo Fundo no Kawa o Watare
 The Manhunt, or Manhunt in the City, a 1975 Italian film 
 Manhunt: The Search for Bin Laden, a 2013 documentary directed by Greg Barker about the hunt for bin Laden
 Bloodfist VII: Manhunt, a 1995 action-adventure film starring Don Wilson

Other media 
 Manhunt: The Ten-Year Search for Bin Laden From 9/11 to Abbottabad, a 2012 book by journalist Peter Bergen
 Manhunt (video game series)
 Manhunt (video game), a 2003 video game published by Rockstar Games
 Manhunt 2, a 2007 sequel to the above
 "Manhunt", a song by Karen Kamon from the 1983 film Flashdance
 "Manhunt", a 2003 song by Winnebago Deal on the album Plata O Plomo

See also 
 Manhunter (disambiguation)
 Human hunting, humans being hunted and killed for other persons' revenge, pleasure, entertainment, sports, or sustenance